Otto Lowy (1921 – May 29, 2002) was the host of CBC Radio 2's The Transcontinental for 22 years until his death. The program was introduced each week as a "musical train ride through Europe".

Lowy was born in Prague, Czechoslovakia, to an assimilated Jewish family and was the only member of his immediate family to survive World War II as he fled the country three days before Germany invaded. In England he worked as a member of the ground crew for the Czech Air Force squadron of the RAF. In 1948, he settled in Vancouver, British Columbia, and began his career with CBC Radio, initially as an actor in the series  Adventures in Europe. He went on to write radio plays, make documentaries as well as act in dramas and comedies.  
 
He was one of the founders of Vancouver's Arts Club Theatre in 1964.

References

1921 births
2002 deaths
Canadian male dramatists and playwrights
British emigrants to Canada
Czech people of Jewish descent
Jewish Canadian male actors
Male actors from Vancouver
Jews who immigrated to the United Kingdom to escape Nazism
Naturalised citizens of the United Kingdom
Canadian male voice actors
20th-century Canadian dramatists and playwrights
Writers from Vancouver
CBC Radio hosts
20th-century Canadian male writers
Royal Air Force airmen
Royal Air Force personnel of World War II
Czechoslovak military personnel of World War II
Czechoslovak emigrants to the United Kingdom